Gulab Singh Yadav is an Indian politician and a member of the Matiala (Delhi Assembly constituency) in India. He represents the Matiala constituency of Delhi and is a member of the Aam Aadmi Party political party.

Early life and  education
Gulab Singh Yadav was born in Delhi. He attended the National Institute of Open Schooling and is educated till twelfth grade.

Political career 
Gulab Singh Yadav is a  MLA for two terms. He represents the Matiala constituency and is a member of the Aam Aadmi Party political party. On 21 November 2022, he was beaten in a public gathering by his own party workers accusing him of selling the coveted tickets for contesting MCD elections.

Posts held

Electoral Performance

See also

 Delhi Legislative Assembly
 Matiala (Delhi Assembly constituency)
 Sixth Legislative Assembly of Delhi

References 

1978 births
Aam Aadmi Party politicians from Delhi
Delhi MLAs 2015–2020
Delhi MLAs 2020–2025
Living people
People from New Delhi